Historic Hotels of America  is a program of the National Trust for Historic Preservation that was founded in 1989 with 32 charter members; the program accepts nominations and identifies hotels that have maintained their authenticity, sense of place, and architectural integrity. In 2015, the program included over 260 members in 44 states, including the District of Columbia, Puerto Rico, and the U.S. Virgin Islands. In 2022, the program includes 273 hotels. This article lists current and former member hotels.

Authentically historic hotels "that have a story to tell" are worth more.

Membership
To be included in the program, a hotel must be at least 50 years old; designated by the U.S. Secretary of the Interior as a National Historic Landmark or listed on or eligible for listing on the National Register of Historic Places; and recognized as having historic significance.

The program generates funds for the National Trust through commissions on bookings done through their website, and from membership fees.

Its charter members were as follows (this includes a number of charter members no longer with the organization as of 2022):

 Fairmont Copley Plaza (1912), Boston, Massachusetts
 Hotel duPont (1903), Wilmington, Delaware
 John Rutledge House (1763), Charleston, South Carolina
 Kings Courtyard Inn (1853), Charleston, South Carolina
 La Valencia Hotel (1926), La Jolla, California
 Moana Surfrider (1901), the first hotel in Waikiki, Honolulu, Hawaii
 Morrison-Clark Historic Inn (1864), Washington, D.C.
 Omni Bretton Arms Inn, Bretton Woods, New Hampshire (1896)
 Omni Mount Washington Resort, Bretton Woods, New Hampshire (1902)
 Strater Hotel (1887), Durango, Colorado
 The Broadmoor (1918), Colorado Springs, Colorado
 The Brown Hotel (1923), Louisville, Kentucky
 The Don CeSar (1928), St. Pete Beach, Florida
 The Menger Hotel (1859), San Antonio, Texas
 The Jefferson Hotel (1895), Richmond, Virginia
 The Martha Washington Inn & Spa (1832), Abingdon, Virginia
 The Mayflower Hotel, Autograph Collection (1925), Washington, D.C., the oldest continuously operating hotel in D.C.
 The Omni Homestead Resort (1766), Hot Springs, Virginia
 The Red Lion Inn (1773), Stockbridge, Massachusetts

Former members:
 The Admiral Hotel (1940), Mobile, Alabama
 The Bellevue Hotel (1904), Philadelphia, Pennsylvania
 Timberline Lodge (1937), Mount Hood, Oregon

Current and former members of the HHA program, by state, include:

KEY

Alabama
 Battle House Hotel (1852), Mobile
 Grand Hotel Golf Resort & Spa (1847), Point Clear

Former members:
 founding: The Admiral Hotel (1940), Mobile
 Redmont Hotel (1925), Birmingham.

Alaska
 Hotel Captain Cook (1964), Anchorage

Arizona
 Bright Angel Lodge & Cabins (1935), Grand Canyon
 El Tovar Hotel (1905), Grand Canyon
 Phantom Ranch (1922), Grand Canyon
 The Wigwam (1929), Litchfield Park
 Hotel San Carlos (1886), Phoenix
 Royal Palms Resort and Spa (1948), Phoenix
 Hassayampa Inn (1927), Prescott
 Tubac Golf Resort and Spa (1959), Tubac
 Hacienda Del Sol Guest Ranch Resort (1929), Tucson
 White Stallion Ranch (1900), Tucson.  A dude ranch.

Former members:
 Hotel Valley Ho (1956), Scottsdale
 The Hotel Congress (1919), Tucson.  Where John Dillinger was captured.

Arkansas
 1886 Crescent Hotel & Spa (1886), Eureka Springs
 Capital Hotel (1870), Little Rock

California

 The Inn at Death Valley (1927)
 Stonepine Estate (1920), Carmel Valley
 Hayes Mansion (1905), San Jose
 Claremont Club & Spa (1915), Berkeley (a Fairmont hotel).
 Palace Hotel (1875), San Francisco
 Omni San Francisco Hotel (1926–27), San Francisco, was built as the Finance Center Building, "designed by architect Frederick H. Meyer in collaboration with Albin R. Johnson"
 Intercontinental Mark Hopkins Hotel (1926), San Francisco
 Fairmont Heritage Place, Ghirardelli Square (1893), San Francisco. Includes NRHP-listed clocktower.
 Inn at the Presidio (1903), San Francisco, originally Pershing Hall Bachelor Officers’ Quarters.
 The Lodge at the Presidio (1894), San Francisco
 Cavallo Point (1903), Marin County
 Hotel del Coronado (1888), Coronado
 Napa River Inn (1884), Napa
 Fairmont Sonoma Mission Inn & Spa (1927), Sonoma
 Hotel La Rose (1907), Santa Rosa
 The Fairmont Hotel San Francisco (1907)
 Benbow Inn (1926), Garberville
 The Alisal Guest Ranch and Resort (1946), Solvang
 Rancho Bernardo Inn (1963), San Diego
 Surf & Sand Resort (1948), Laguna Beach
 Fairmont Century Plaza (1961), Los Angeles.

Former members:
 Hotel Constance Pasadena (1926), Pasadena
 Berkeley City Club (1929), Berkeley, built as a women's club.  Designed by Julia Morgan.
 Hotel Whitcomb (1916), San Francisco
 The Huntington Hotel (1924), San Francisco

Colorado
 founding: Strater Hotel (1887), Durango
 founding: The Broadmoor (1918), Colorado Springs
 Hotel Boulderado (1909), Boulder
 The Cliff House at Pikes Peak (1874), Manitou Springs
 Hotel Colorado (1893), Glenwood Springs

Former members:
The Stanley Hotel, Estes Park, Colorado

Connecticut
 1754 House (1754), Woodbury, Connecticut
 Water's Edge Resort and Spa (1920s), Westbrook. "Originating from the vision of humanitarian Bill Hahn, the resort has jovial beginnings."

Former members:
 The Spa at Norwich Inn (1929), Norwich. Colonial Revival.

Delaware
 founding: Hotel duPont (1903), Wilmington, within DuPont Building
 The Inn at Montchanin Village (1799), Montchanin, which is distributed through 11 buildings.

Florida

 founding: The Don CeSar (1928), St. Pete Beach. Ten-story hotel on St. Pete Beach. Moorish Revival.
 Belleview Inn (1897), Belleair.  Built for Henry Plant.
 The Gasparilla Inn & Club (1913), Boca Grande. Classic Revival.
 Colony Hotel & Cabana Club (1926), Delray Beach. Spanish Colonial Revival
 Casa Marina Hotel and Restaurant (1925), Jacksonville Beach. Spanish Colonial Revival.
 La Concha Hotel & Spa (1926), Key West. Colonial Revival.
 Casa Faena (1928), Miami Beach.
 The National Hotel (1940), Miami Beach. Art Deco, designed by Roy France.
 Casa Monica Resort & Spa (1888), St. Augustine. Moorish Revival.
 The Vinoy Renaissance St. Petersburg Resort & Golf Club (1925), St. Petersburg, overlooking Tampa Bay.  Mediterranean Revival.
 The Lodge at Wakulla Springs (1937), Wakulla Springs. Built in 1937 by industrialist Edward Ball.
 The Savoy Hotel & Beach Club (1935), Miami Beach, Florida

Former members:
 The Terrace Hotel (1924), Lakeland. Renaissance Revival.
 Greystone Miami Beach (1939), Miami Beach. Designed by Henry Hohauser. Art Deco.

Georgia

 The Candler Hotel Atlanta, Curio Collection by Hilton (1904), Atlanta
 Georgian Terrace Hotel (1911), Atlanta. Gone with the Wind-related, in Fox Theatre Historic District.
 Greyfield Inn (1900), Cumberland Island
 Jekyll Island Club Resort (1887), Jekyll Island
 River Street Inn (1817), Savannah. In former cotton warehouse buildings.
 The King and Prince Beach and Golf Resort (1935), St. Simons Island
 The DeSoto (1890), Savannah.  This is a 1968 replacement to a historic hotel that was built in 1890, demolished in 1965 or so. It is located in Savannah Historic District.
 JW Marriott Savannah Plant Riverside District (1912), Savannah.
 Hotel Indigo Atlanta Midtown (1925), Atlanta.

Former members:
 Partridge Inn (1910), Augusta

Hawaii

 Mauna Kea Beach Hotel, Kohala Coast
 Hilton Hawaiian Village/Waikiki Beach Resort (1957), Honolulu, Oahu
 The Royal Hawaiian (1927), Honolulu, Oahu
 Pioneer Inn (1901), Maui
 founding: Moana Surfrider (1901), the first hotel on Waikiki, Honolulu, Oahu

Former members:
 Grand Naniloa Hotel (1939), Hilo

Illinois
 Hilton Chicago (1927), Chicago. Beaux Arts.
 InterContinental Chicago Magnificent Mile, Chicago.  Built "in 1929 as the Medinah Athletic Club, a luxury men's club for members of the Shrine organization." Art Deco.
 Palmer House, A Hilton Hotel, Chicago. Remodeled in 2004. Beaux Arts
 The Drake Hotel (1920), Chicago. Italian Renaissance.
 The Silversmith Hotel (1896), Chicago. Arts & Crafts.
 21c Museum Hotel Chicago by MGallery (1927), Chicago.

Former members:
 LondonHouse Chicago, Chicago.  Or LondonHouse Chicago, Curio Collection by Hilton. Beaux Arts.

Indiana
 French Lick Springs Hotel (1901), French Lick, at Pluto Mineral Springs. Beaux Arts.
 Omni Severin Hotel, Indianapolis (1913), Beaux Arts.
 Morris Inn at Notre Dame (1952), Notre Dame. Gothic Revival.
 West Baden Springs Hotel (1901), West Baden Springs. "is the crown jewel of French Lick Resort's $500 million restoration." It is a National Historic Landmark.

Former members:
 The Sherman, (1852), Batesville. "in the heart of historic downtown Batesville, a convenient midway meeting point between Indianapolis and Cincinnati, The Sherman is a well-loved locale for the people of the town and an important Indiana landmark." Tudor Style.

Kentucky
 Boone Tavern Hotel of Berea College (1909), Berea
 21c Museum Hotel Lexington by MGallery (1914), Lexington, Beaux Arts
 21c Museum Hotel Louisville by MGallery (1800s), Louisville.  Incorporates Falls City Tobacco Bank
 The Brown Hotel (1923), Louisville

Former members:
 The Campbell House Curio, A Collection by Hilton (1951), Lexington
 The Sire Hotel Lexington, Tapestry Collection by Hilton (1916), Lexington. The Sire Hotel Lexington "on site of the former Gratz Park Inn, which is part of Lexington's beautiful Gratz Park Historic District. The location was originally the home of a family medical practice called the Lexington Clinic."
 The Seelbach Hilton Louisville (1905), Louisville, in Beaux Arts style

Louisiana
 Hilton Baton Rouge Capitol Center (1927), Baton Rouge
 Southern Hotel (1907), Covington, Louisiana, included in the Division of St. John Historic District
 Bienville House (1835), New Orleans, converted into a hotel in 1967
 Hilton New Orleans/St. Charles Avenue (1926), New Orleans
 Hotel Monteleone (1886), New Orleans
 Le Pavillon Hotel (1907), New Orleans, an early skyscraper
 NOPSI New Orleans (1927), New Orleans, in Chicago School style.  It is a Salamander Hotel.
 Omni Royal Orleans (1843), New Orleans, previously known as The City Exchange, as St. Louis Hotel, and as St. Louis Exchange

Former members:
 Nottoway Plantation and Resort (1859), White Castle, whose original mansion is claimed to be the largest surviving antebellum plantation mansion

Maine
 The Colony Hotel (1914), Kennebunkport, also known as "The Colony", included in Cape Arundel Summer Colony Historic District.
 Portland Regency Hotel & Spa (1895), Portland

Former members:
 The Westin Portland Harborview, originally "The Eastland", Portland.  Refused to let Eleanor Roosevelt stay there.

Maryland
 Historic Inns of Annapolis (1727), Annapolis. Colonial Revival
 Hotel Brexton (1881), Baltimore. Queen Anne
 Lord Baltimore Hotel (1928), Baltimore. Listed on the National Register of Historic Places. Beaux Arts
 Inn at Perry Cabin (1816), St. Michaels.  designed by Commodore Oliver Hazard Perry’s aide-de-camp, Samuel Hambleton. Greek Revival
 Antrim 1844 (1844), Taneytown.  Listed on the National Register of Historic Places

Massachusetts
 Inn on Boltwood (1926), Amherst. Colonial – Colonial Revival
 founding: Fairmont Copley Plaza (1912), Boston. Designed by Henry Janeway Hardenbergh. Renaissance Revival
 Hilton Boston Downtown/Faneuil Hall (1928), Boston.  Asserted to be "Boston's first Art Deco skyscraper".
 Omni Parker House, Boston (1855), Boston. Classic Revival
 XV Beacon (1903), Boston. Beaux Arts
 The Kendall Hotel (1895), Cambridge.  In Victorian firehouse asserted to be the oldest building in the Kendall Square area.
 Concord's Colonial Inn (1716), Concord. Federal.
 Crowne Pointe Historic Inn (1900), Provincetown. Victorian
 Hawthorne Hotel (1925), Salem. Colonial Revival
 founding: The Red Lion Inn (1773), Stockbridge. Federal
 Publick House Historic Inn (1771), Sturbridge
 Chatham Bars Inn (1914), Chatham, Massachusetts

Former members:
 Boston Park Plaza, (1927) Boston 
 Harbor View Hotel of Martha's Vineyard (1891), Edgartown. Shingle Style.

Michigan
 Amway Grand Plaza, Curio Collection by Hilton (1913), Grand Rapids, originally the Pantlind Hotel
 Grand Hotel (1887), Mackinac Island
 Island House Hotel (1887), Mackinac Island

Former members:
 Landmark Inn (1930), Marquette
 DoubleTree Suites by Hilton Hotel Detroit Downtown - Fort Shelby (1917), Detroit
 The Inn on Ferry Street, Detroit, in East Ferry Avenue Historic District

Minnesota
 St. James Hotel (1875), Red Wing
 The Saint Paul Hotel (1910), Saint Paul

Missouri
 The Raphael Hotel (1928), Kansas City
 St. Louis Union Station Hotel (1894), St. Louis, in Union Station (St. Louis)
 Hotel Indigo St. Louis Downtown (1909), St. Louis

Former members:
 Hilton President Kansas City (1926), Kansas City
 Hotel Phillips Kansas City (1931), Kansas City
 Hilton St. Louis Downtown at the Arch (1888), St. Louis, was the Merchant Laclede National Bank

Montana
 Many Glacier Hotel (1915), Babb
 Lake McDonald Lodge (1914), Glacier National Park
 The Andrus Hotel (1917), Dillon.  HHA member in 2022, has been member since 2021.

Nebraska
 The Peregrine Omaha Downtown, Curio Collection by Hilton (1912), Omaha, Nebraska

Former members:
 The Redick Tower was formerly an HHA member.

Nevada
 Mizpah Hotel (1907), Tonopah, aka Grand Old Lady

New Hampshire
 founding: Omni Bretton Arms Inn (1896), Bretton Woods.  "44-nation Bretton Woods Monetary Conference in 1944." Queen Anne.
 founding: Mount Washington Hotel (1902), Bretton Woods. "was the setting for the historic Bretton Woods Monetary Conference in 1944." Renaissance Revival.
 Hanover Inn Dartmouth (1780?), Hanover. On site of home of General Ebenezer Brewster. Colonial Revival.
 Eagle Mountain House, Jackson. Colonial Revival
 Wentworth by the Sea (1874), New Castle. Second Empire
 Mountain View Grand Resort & Spa, Whitefield

Former members:
 The Bedford Village Inn, Bedford.  Colonial Revival

New Mexico
 Hilton Santa Fe Historic Plaza (1625), Santa Fe
 La Fonda (1922), Santa Fe
 La Posada de Santa Fe (1882), Santa Fe
 Old Santa Fe Inn (1930), Santa Fe

Formerly listed:
 Plaza Hotel 1982 (1882), Las Vegas

New Jersey
 Caribbean Motel (1957), Wildwood Crest.  " in the New Jersey beach resort community of The Wildwoods – home to the largest surviving collection of mid-20th century commercial beach resort architecture in North America."

New York
 Bear Mountain Inn, Bear Mountain
 The Otesaga Hotel and Cooper Inn, Cooperstown. Colonial Revival
 The Queensbury Hotel, Glens Falls. Overlooking City Park on Ridge Street. Colonial Revival
 Oheka Castle, Huntington. Renaissance Revival
 Mohonk Mountain House (1869), New Paltz. Victorian
 JW Marriott Essex House, New York. Art Deco
 Omni Berkshire Place, New York City (1926), New York. "Warren & Wetmore built this historic landmark hotel in 1926. The Berkshire Hotel was purchased in May 1978 by the Dunfey Hotels Corporation, which included the Omni Hotels and Dunfey Hotels groups. The property received a $9.5 million face-lift in 1979." Classic Revival.
 Martinique New York on Broadway, Curio Collection by Hilton, New York. "Designed by Henry Hardenbergh, who also designed the Waldorf Astoria, the Plaza Hotel, and the Dakota Apartments on Central Park." Beaux Arts
 The Plaza, New York. Beaux Arts
 The Redbury New York, New York. Renaissance Revival
 The Renwick Hotel New York City, Curio Collection by Hilton, New York. Renaissance Revival
 Beekman Arms and Delamater Inn (1766), Rhinebeck
 Hotel Saranac, Curio Collection by Hilton, Saranac Lake. Colonial Revival
 Marriott Syracuse Downtown (1924), Syracuse.  Originally the Hotel Syracuse, reopened in 2016 as Marriott Syracuse Downtown. Renaissance Revival.
 The Sagamore, Bolton Landing
 Blue Moon Hotel, New York, New York (1879), New York.

Former members:
 AKA Sutton Place, New York. Art Deco
 AKA Times Square, New York. Romanesque Revival
 AKA Wall Street, New York. Beaux Arts
 Hotel Skyler Syracuse, Tapestry Collection by Hilton (1921), Syracuse. Occupied by the Temple Adath Yeshurun for more than 50 years, later housed the Salt City Theatre Group. Now asserted to be "the third hotel in the United States and the first in Syracuse to be certified LEED Platinum." Georgian Revival.
 Jefferson Clinton Hotel (1927), Syracuse. Beaux Arts
 Castle Hotel & Spa, Tarrytown. Gothic Revival
 Hotel Utica (1912), Utica. "Opened as Hotel Utica in 1912, it was the premier hotel in Central New York."

North Carolina
 Haywood Park Hotel (1923), Asheville. Located in a former department store building. Classic Revival
 The Omni Grove Park Inn (1913), Asheville. Arts & Crafts, with red clay tile roof and original Roycroft furnishings and fixtures.
 Green Park Inn (1891), Blowing Rock. Queen Anne Victorian style
 The Dunhill Hotel (1929), Charlotte
 21c Museum Hotel Durham by MGallery (1937), Durham. Art Deco.  Also known as Hotel Durham, it is located in the former Durham Bank & Trust Company building.
 Pinehurst Resort (1895), Pinehurst.  Includes 3 hotels, in a National Historic Landmark District.
 The Graylyn Estate (1932), Winston-Salem
 The Historic Magnolia House (1889), Greensboro.

Former members:
 Mast Farm Inn (1792), Banner Elk "an award-winning and world renowned historic country inn and restaurant" in the Valle Crucis Historic District, "which has been welcoming guests since the 1800s."  Colonial Revival

Ohio 
 21c Museum Hotel Cincinnati (1912), Cincinnati.
 Ariel Broadway Hotel (1925), Lorain.
 Best Western Mariemont Inn (1926), Cincinnati.
 Hilton Cincinnati Netherland Plaza (1931), Cincinnati.

Oklahoma
 Inn at Price Tower (1956), Bartlesville. In the Price Tower designed by Frank Lloyd Wright
 21c Museum Hotel Oklahoma City by MGallery (1916), Oklahoma City. NRHP-listed, in Albert Kahn-designed Oklahoma City Ford Motor Company Assembly Plant
 The Skirvin Hilton Oklahoma City (1911), Oklahoma City. NRHP-listed as Skirvin Hotel
 The Atherton Hotel at Oklahoma State University (1950), Stillwater. Originally the "Union Club"

Former members:
 Tulsa Club Hotel, Curio Collection by Hilton (1927), Tulsa

Oregon
 Ashland Springs Hotel, Ashland
 Crater Lake Lodge, White City
 Embassy Suites by Hilton Portland Downtown (1912), Portland. Originally the Multnomah Hotel.

Former members:
 The Heathman Hotel (1927), Portland

Pennsylvania
 Omni Bedford Springs Resort (1806), Bedford. Eclectic
 Hotel Bethlehem (1922), Bethlehem. Beaux Arts
 The Sayre Mansion (1858), Bethlehem. Gothic Revival
 The Lodge at Nemacolin Woodlands Resort (1968), Farmington.  Located "at the center of the world-famous Nemacolin Woodlands Resort, it was once the peaceful hunting lodge of the Pittsburgh industrial titan, Willard F. Rockwell. Constructed in 1968, its immense popularity among his loved ones inspired Rockwell to turn the building into a vacation spot open to the public." Tudor Revival
 Ledges Hotel (1890), Hawley. Originally the John S. O'Connor Glass Factory. Federal
 Silver Birches (hotel) (1929), Hawley.  In 13 historic structures on shoreline of Lake Wallenpaupack. Includes Colonial Revival architecture.
 The Settlers Inn at Bingham Park (1927), Hawley. Has Arts & Crafts furniture. Tudor Revival
 The Hotel Hershey (1933), Hershey.  Implemented idiosyncratic vision of Milton S. Hershey. Spanish Colonial Revival
 Cork Factory Hotel (1865), Lancaster. Eclectic
 Lancaster Arts Hotel (1881), Lancaster. Eclectic
 The Inn at Leola Village, Est. 1867 (1867), Leola. In Pennsylvania Dutch Country near Lancaster, Pennsylvania.  Includes "five restored agricultural structures including two 19th-century farmhouses and a tobacco barn," three holding guest rooms.
 Omni William Penn Hotel (1916), Pittsburgh.  Classic Revival
 Skytop Lodge (1928), Skytop. Colonial Revival
 The Nittany Lion Inn of the Pennsylvania State University (1931), State College. Colonial Revival
 Penn Wells Hotel (1869), Wellsboro.  Adjacent to associated Art Deco-style Arcadia Theatre. Victorian.
 Hotel Warner (1930), West Chester, also known as the Warner Theater.  NRHP-listed in 1979 as a theater; converted into a hotel in 2012.
 Eagles Mere Inn (1887), Eagles MERE became an HHA member in 2021 It is a contributing building in the NRHP-listed Eagles Mere Historic District,
 Glasbern (1870), Fogelsville.
 Morris House Hotel (1787), Philadelphia.
 Historic Americus Hotel (1926), Allentown.

Former members:
 Gettysburg Hotel, Est.1797 (1797), Gettysburg.  Beaux Arts
 AKA Rittenhouse Square (1912), Philadelphia. Beaux Arts
 The Bellevue Hotel (1904), Philadelphia.  Renovated in 2016. Renaissance Revival.
 Distrikt Hotel Pittsburgh, Curio Collection by Hilton (1924), Pittsburgh. Listed on the National Register of Historic Places.  Originally served as the headquarters for the Salvation Army’s Western Pennsylvania Division.

Rhode Island
 Newport Beach Hotel & Suites (1940), Middletown, "formerly known as the Inn at Newport Beach." A massive hurricane in 1938 wiped out the town's numerous beach establishments. Two years later, after the sand settled, the Toppa family decided to build a new inn on the beach, positioning the property 100 feet from the rocks and the ocean's crashing waves." Colonial Revival
 The Hotel Viking (1926), Newport, "the most recent multi-million dollar renovation finished in 2007".  Viking Hotel.

South Carolina
 Francis Marion Hotel (1924), Charleston
 founding: John Rutledge House Inn (1763), Charleston
 founding: Kings Courtyard Inn (1853), Charleston
 The Dewberry (1964–65), Charleston.  Mid-century modern building, originally the L. Mendel Rivers Federal Building, in the Charleston Historic District.
 Wentworth Mansion (1886), Charleston, Second Empire in style, in the Charleston Historic District.
 The Westin Poinsett (1925), Greenville
 Fulton Lane Inn (1889), Charleston

South Dakota
 Hotel Alex Johnson (1928), Rapid City
 Hotel on Phillips (1917), Sioux Falls

Tennessee
 The Peabody Memphis, Memphis
 General Morgan Inn & Conference Center (1884), Greeneville.  Originally the Grand Hotel, later the Hotel Brumley. John Hunt Morgan was shot and fell here. Included in Greenville Historic District.
 21c Museum Hotel Nashville by MGallery (1895) in  NRHP-listed Second Avenue Commercial District.
 Union Station Hotel Nashville, Autograph Collection, Nashville.  Within Union Station (Nashville), a former National Historic Landmark.
 Hermitage Hotel, Nashville.  Claimed to be "the only remaining grand hotel in Nashville and the only commercial Beaux Arts structure in the state."

Texas
 founding: Menger Hotel (1859), San Antonio
 Hotel Settles (1930), Big Spring
 The Stagecoach Inn (1852), Salado
 The Ashton Hotel, Fort Worth
 Hilton Fort Worth (1921), Fort Worth.  Originally Hotel Texas
 The Statler (1956), Dallas
 The Whitehall, Houston
 Omni La Mansion Del Rio, San Antonio
 The Crockett Hotel (1909), San Antonio
 Emily Morgan San Antonio - a DoubleTree by Hilton Hotel (1924), San Antonio

Former members:
 The Sam Houston Hotel, Houston

Utah
 Zion Lodge (1924), Springdale, designed by Gilbert Stanley Underwood, located in Zion National Park

Vermont
 Castle Hill Resort and Spa, Cavendish
 The Middlebury Inn (1827?), Middlebury.  Begun as the Vermont Hotel, a brick "public house" opened by Nathan Wood in 1827. Federal.
 Basin Harbor, Vergennes.  On Lake Champlain. Eclectic.
 Woodstock Inn & Resort, Woodstock.

Virginia
 founding: The Omni Homestead Resort (1766), Hot Springs, formerly The Homestead.
 founding: The Martha Washington Hotel & Spa (1832), Abingdon.  Martha Washington Inn.
 The Mimslyn Inn (1931), Luray.  Georgian Revival architecture. Included in Luray Downtown Historic District.
 The Virginian Lynchburg, Curio Collection by Hilton (1913), Lynchburg
 Inn at Willow Grove (1778), Orange
 founding: The Jefferson Hotel (1895), Richmond
 Blackburn Inn (1828), Staunton, Virginia, built as Western State Hospital (Staunton, Virginia).
 Stonewall Jackson Hotel & Conference Center (1924), Staunton. Stonewall Jackson Hotel
 Airlie (1899), Warrenton. Also known as Airlie Conference Center, partly in original post office.
 Williamsburg Inn (1937), Williamsburg
 Williamsburg Lodge, Autograph Collection, and Colonial Houses (1750), Williamsburg

Former members:
 Boar's Head Resort (1834), Charlottesville
 The Georges (1789), Lexington, in the Lexington Historic District
 The Hotel Roanoke & Conference Center, Curio - A Collection by Hilton (1882), Roanoke. Hotel Roanoke, NRHP-listed.
 The Cavalier Virginia Beach, Autograph Collection (1927), Virginia Beach. Cavalier Hotel.

Washington
 Mayflower Park Hotel (1927), Seattle
 Fairmont Olympic Hotel (1924), Seattle.  Originally the Olympic Hotel.

West Virginia
Former members:
 Blennerhassett Hotel, Parkersburg

Wisconsin
 The American Club (1918), Kohler. Walter J. Kohler Sr. founded it.  Tudor-style.
 The Edgewater (1948), Madison.  Art Deco
 Hilton Milwaukee City Center (1928), Milwaukee, built as the Schroeder Hotel
 The Pfister Hotel (1893), Milwaukee.  Romanesque Revival

Wyoming
 Old Faithful Inn (1904), Yellowstone National Park.  A National Historic Landmark.
 Lake Yellowstone Hotel & Cabins (1891), Yellowstone National Park
 Sheridan Inn (1892), Sheridan
 Alpenhof Lodge (1965), Teton Village
 The Wort Hotel (1941), Jackson

Washington, D.C.

 founding: Morrison-Clark Historic Inn (1864)
 founding: The Mayflower Hotel (1925)
 Capital Hilton (1943)
 The Churchill (1906), originally a luxury apartment building
 Georgetown Inn (1962)
 The Graham Georgetown, Tapestry Collection by Hilton (1962)
 Hamilton Hotel (1851)
 The Henley Park Hotel (1918)
 Hotel Lombardy (1929), converted to a hotel in 1994
 Melrose Georgetown Hotel (1947)
 Omni Shoreham Hotel (1930)
 Phoenix Park Hotel (1922)
 Riggs Washington DC (1891)
 Sofitel Washington DC Lafayette Square (1925)
 Willard InterContinental Washington (1901)
 Washington Hilton (1965)

Puerto Rico
 Condado Vanderbilt Hotel (1919), San Juan
 El Convento Hotel (1651), San Juan, Spanish Colonial architecture
 Fairmont El San Juan Hotel (1958), San Juan

Former members:
 Caribe Hilton (1949), San Juan
 The Condado Plaza Hilton (1963), San Juan,  International style

U.S. Virgin Islands

Former members:
 The Buccaneer (1653), Christiansted

See also

Notes

References

External links
 2019 HHA directory

Hotel affiliation groups
 
National Trust for Historic Preservation